The Sword and the Rose is a family/adventure film produced by Perce Pearce and Walt Disney and directed by Ken Annakin. The film features the story of Mary Tudor, a younger sister of Henry VIII of England.

Based on the 1898 novel When Knighthood Was in Flower by Charles Major, it was originally made into a motion picture in 1908 and again in 1922 as When Knighthood Was in Flower. The 1953 Disney version was adapted for the screen by Lawrence Edward Watkin. The film was shot at Denham Film Studios and was the third of Disney's British productions after Treasure Island (1950) and The Story of Robin Hood and His Merrie Men (1952). In 1956, it was broadcast on American television in two parts under the original book title.

Plot 
Mary Tudor falls in love with a new arrival to court, Charles Brandon. She persuades her brother King Henry VIII to make him his Captain of the Guard. Meanwhile, Henry is determined to marry her off to the aging King Louis XII of France as part of a peace agreement. Mary's longtime suitor the Duke of Buckingham takes a dislike to Charles as he is a commoner and the Duke wants Mary for himself. However, troubled by his feelings for the princess, Brandon resigns and decides to sail to the New World. Against the advice of her lady-in-waiting Lady Margaret, Mary dresses up like a boy and follows Brandon to Bristol. Henry's men find them and throw Brandon in the Tower of London. King Henry agrees to spare his life if Mary will marry King Louis and tells her that when Louis dies she is free to marry whomever she wants. Meanwhile, Mary asks the Duke of Buckingham for help but he only pretends to help Brandon escape from the Tower, really planning to have him killed while escaping. The duke thinks he is drowned in the Thames, but he survives.

Mary marries King Louis and encourages him to drink to excess and be active so that his already deteriorating health worsens. His heir Francis makes it clear that he will not return Mary to England after the king's death, but keep her for himself. When she goes to him for help, the Duke of Buckingham tells Lady Margaret that Brandon is dead and decides to go "rescue" Mary himself. Lady Margaret discovers that Brandon is alive and learning of the duke's treachery they hurry back to France. Louis dies and the Duke of Buckingham arrives in France to bring Mary back to England. He tells her that Brandon is dead and tries to force her to marry him. Charles arrives in time, rescues her and wounds the duke in a duel. Mary and Brandon are married and remind Henry of his promise to let her pick her second husband. He forgives them and makes Charles Duke of Suffolk.

Cast 
 Glynis Johns as Mary Tudor
 James Robertson Justice as King Henry VIII
 Richard Todd as Charles Brandon, 1st Duke of Suffolk
 Michael Gough as Duke of Buckingham
 Jane Barrett as Lady Margaret 
 Peter Copley as Sir Edwin Caskoden
 Ernest Jay as Lord Chamberlain  
 Jean Mercure as Louis XII
 D. A. Clarke-Smith as Cardinal Wolsey
 Gérard Oury as Dauphin of France
 Fernand Fabre as DeLongueville 
 Gaston Richer as Antoine Duprat
 Rosalie Crutchley as Queen Katherine
 Bryan Coleman as Earl of Surrey
 Helen Goss as Princess Claude
 Patrick Cargill as French Diplomat 
 Anthony Sharp as French Diplomat
 Richard Molinas as Father Pierre

Production
At the end of 1948, funds from Walt Disney Productions stranded in foreign countries, including the United Kingdom, exceeded $8.5 million. Walt Disney decided to create a studio in Britain, RKO-Walt Disney British Productions, Ltd. in association with RKO Radio Pictures and started production of Treasure Island (1950). With the success of Robin Hood and His Merrie Men (1952), Disney wanted to keep the production team to make a second film; he chose The Sword and the Rose inspired by the novel When Knighthood Was in Flower (1898) by Charles Major. This team consisted of the director Ken Annakin, producer Douglas Pierce, writer Lawrence Edward Watkin, and the artistic director Carmen Dillon.

The film was officially announced in June 1952. In July the title was changed from When Knighthood was in Flower to The Sword and the Rose.

At the beginning of production, Annakin and Dillon went to Burbank, Disney Studios in order to develop the script and set the stage with storyboards, a technique used by Annakin on production of Robin Hood . During this step, each time a batch of storyboards was finished, it was presented to Walt Disney who commented and brought his personal touch. Annakin was granted great freedom with the dialogue.

Walt Disney came to oversee the production of the film in the UK from June to September 1952. The team spent several months researching period details to make the film more realistic. Working in pre-production had helped reduce the need for natural settings in favor of studio sets designed by Peter Ellenshaw. Ellenshaw painted sets for 62 different scenes in total. According to Leonard Maltin, Ellenshaw's work was such that it is sometimes impossible to tell where the painting ends and reality begins.

Filming began in July 1952 at Pinewood Studios.

Todd was thrown from a horse while filming the trailer and was in bed for three weeks.

It was distributed by RKO under a new arrangement between that film and Disney.

Reception
The film's budget exceeded that of Robin Hood and His Merrie Men, but it earned only $2.5 million.

The film disappointed at the US box office but did better in other countries. However, the relative failure of this and Rob Roy, the Highland Rogue caused Disney to become less enthusiastic about costume pictures.

The film was serialized in the show The Wonderful World of Disney.

Analysis
Leonard Maltin surmised that The Sword and the Rose is historically equivalent to Pinocchio (1940) although it remains primarily a dramatic entertainment featuring costumed actors. However, it was greeted coolly in the UK mainly because of its historical approximations despite reviews from The Times that said that Mary had "remarkably alive moments" and James Robertson Justice's King Henry had "a royal air". On the other side of the Atlantic in the United States the New York Times reviewed the film as "a time consuming tangle of mild satisfaction". Despite these criticisms, the team responsible for the film was reassembled for another film Rob Roy, the Highland Rogue.

Peter Ellenshaw's work on set allowed him to get a "lifetime contract" with the Disney studio. He moved to the United States after the shooting of 20,000 Leagues Under the Sea (1954).

Douglas Brode draws a parallel between The Sword and the Rose and Lady and the Tramp (then in production) in which two female characters of noble lineage are enamored of a poor male character.

Steven Watts sees The Sword and the Rose and Rob Roy as showing the Disney studio's concern for individual liberty fighting against powerful social structures and governments. He is joined in this opinion by Douglas Brode. Brode sees the film and the ball scene, not as a conservative, but as an incentive to "dance crazes" (as the twist) for the American youth of the 1950s and 1960s. The ballroom dancing bears more resemblance to a dance competition in the 1950s than to a minuet of pre-Elizabethan England. Brode sees a form of rebel involvement. The proximity of the dancers, and rhythms not resemble the flip is  introduced to the court by Mary Tudor near the rebellious teenager. Moreover, Henry VIII took advantage of the proximity afforded by this dance to flirt with a young lady of his court. Brode cites the reply of Mary to the older Catherine of Aragon, who is shocked by this dance: "Shall I not have what music and dances I like at my own ball?". Brode said that two years later rock and roll would similarly upset the American nation.

Historical inaccuracies
There are many historical inaccuracies in the film. Charles Brandon was actually a childhood friend of King Henry and not a newcomer to court as is depicted in the film; he had already received the title of Duke of Suffolk from Henry in 1514. Furthermore, the couple's aborted attempt to sail to the New World never happened; indeed, this is an anachronism as the earliest serious English attempts at North American colonization would only occur under Queen Elizabeth I of England, some fifty years later. It was Brandon and not the Duke of Buckingham who escorted Mary back to England after the death of Louis. The duke's involvement is purely fictitious and his wife Eleanor Percy is eliminated entirely from the story. 
King Henry is portrayed as a middle-aged and corpulent figure, although at the time he was only 23. His wife Catherine of Aragon is also shown as a brunette although she was a redhead.

See also
 Cultural depictions of Henry VIII of England

References

External links
  
 
 
 
 

1953 films
American historical adventure films
British historical adventure films
1950s historical adventure films
Walt Disney Pictures films
Films based on American novels
Films set in Tudor England
Films directed by Ken Annakin
Films set in France
Films set in London
Films about Henry VIII
Films scored by Clifton Parker
Films shot at Denham Film Studios
Films shot at Pinewood Studios
Films produced by Perce Pearce
Films produced by Walt Disney
Films adapted into comics
Cultural depictions of Catherine of Aragon
1950s English-language films
1950s American films
1950s British films